Ehsan Khan may refer to:

 Ehsan Khan (architect)
 Ehsan Khan (cricketer)